A Yemeni passport is a government document used by citizens of Yemen for international travel. Yemeni passports are issued by the Immigration and Naturalization Service of the Ministry of the Interior, and by some Yemeni consulates and embassies around the world. 

Yemeni passports are typically 42 pages long and have a dark blue cover inscribed with the Emblem of Yemen (and the words "Republic of Yemen" and "Passport" in English and Arabic). As Arabic is a right-to-left script, the passport pages read from right to left. The passport is valid for six years after the date of issue.

In the old days, when Yemen was a British colony (Colony of Aden), British passports were given to travellers from Yemen.

Page content
The first page of the passport provides the Identity of the passport holder in Arabic and English. On the left of the Identity page is a picture of the passport holder. Other information on the Identity page includes:

Passport number
Country code
Type
Full name
Family name
Place of birth
Date of birth
Gender
Occupation
Issuer
Date of issue
Expiration date
Barcode
Codes for machine reading

Regulations 
The passport of one individual should not be held by others who are not entitled to possess it. Any loss or theft of the passport should immediately reported to the concerned authority.

The title page of the passport holder and details of relatives who are in the Republic of Yemen.

The passport contains a further two pages of notes, four pages of additions and 32 pages for visas.

Passports contain details of the issuer that is shown to the authorities of all other nations, and identify the bearer as a citizen in the issuing country. A passport includes the demand to allow the holder to pass, and be treated in accordance with international standards.

The Foreign Minister requests relevant parties to allow the bearer of this passport to pass freely and also to assist their party in case of difficulties.

Security tags 
Many security tags are found in the Yemeni passport to prevent fraud. Security tags are located on the first page. The barcode and two-dimensional watermark are located in another. When exposed to light, the passport shows a map of Yemen and the country's logo.

When exposed to light, the passport page number, written in Arabic and English, is visible at the top of the sheet on both the sides. The edge of the paper contains a silver stripe flag of the nation repeated 10 times and the word 'Yemen' written in Arabic and English. The emblem of the nation is printed three times in the middle.

Visa requirements

In 2016, Yemeni citizens had visa-free or visa-on-arrival access to 38 countries and territories. This ranked the Yemeni passport 97th worldwide according to the Visa Restrictions Index. However, as of 2019, it has dropped to the 104th spot.

See also 
 Visa requirements for Yemeni citizens
 Visa policy of Yemen

References

External links

Yemen
Government of Yemen